Anatoma kelseyi is a species of minute sea snail, a marine gastropod mollusc or micromollusk in the family Anatomidae.

References

 Geiger D.L. & McLean J.H. (2010) New species and records of Scissurellidae and Anatomidae from the Americas (Mollusca: Gastropoda: Vetigastropoda). Zootaxa 2356: 1-35.

External links
 To World Register of Marine Species

Anatomidae
Gastropods described in 1905